Henricus inchoatus is a species of moth of the family Tortricidae. It is found in Hidalgo, Mexico.

References

Moths described in 1986
Henricus (moth)